Mark Joseph Salzman (born December 3, 1959 in Greenwich, Connecticut) is an American writer. Salzman is best known for his 1986 memoir Iron & Silk, which describes his experiences living in China as an English teacher in the early 1980s.

Salzman grew up in Ridgefield, Connecticut, the oldest child of a piano teacher mother and a social worker father. He studied Chinese Language and Literature at Yale University. His experiences in China are recounted in his first book, Iron & Silk: A young American encounters swordsmen, bureaucrats and other citizens of contemporary China, published in 1986. Salzman received several literary awards for Iron & Silk. The book was made into a 1990 film of the same title. Salzman wrote the screenplay and starred as himself in the film. Though the real venue of the story was in Changsha, the film was shot in Hangzhou, Zhejiang.

Salzman plays the cello. In high school, he played the cello for the Norwalk Youth Symphony. In 1996, he performed as guest cellist with YoYo Ma, pianist Emmanuel Ax, and others at Alice Tully Hall for the 20th anniversary performance of Live From Lincoln Center.

After receiving his 2000 Guggenheim Fellowship, Mark Salzman spent time as a stay-at-home parent.  Salzman, along with three other men, was featured in the 2007 documentary Protagonist, directed by his wife, Jessica Yu. In 2011 he presented a multimedia monologue, An Atheist in Freefall, at the New York Public Library as part of the exhibition Three Faiths: Judaism, Christianity, Islam. 

Salzman continued writing fiction and nonfiction after Iron and Silk. These include a memoir on growing up in suburbia, and one on his work as a creative writing instructor for juvenile delinquents. The most recent is his 2012 memoir, The Man in the Empty Boat, about his search for equanimity after personal catastrophes, which included his sister's untimely death and a nervous breakdown. Common to his later works is a theme of struggling to reach an ideal but falling short, and the quiet changes within a person who faces the possibility of never achieving their goal. Salzman continues to perform the cello; in January 2020 he and his daughter gave a benefit performance for the Hakone Foundation, in Saratoga California. 

Salzman and his wife Jessica Yu, an Academy Award-winning filmmaker, have two daughters. The family makes their home in Southern California.

Works by Salzman
 Iron & Silk (1986), 
 The Laughing Sutra (1991)
 The Soloist (1994)
 Lost in Place: Growing Up Absurd in Suburbia (1995)
 Lying Awake (2000)
 True Notebooks (2003), a book about his experience as a writing teacher in Central Juvenile Hall, as well as the inmates and their writing
 The Man in the Empty Boat (2012), about his struggles with anxiety and writer's block.

References

External links
 
 Steven Barclay Agency
 St. Charles Public Library
 Edward Morris, Teaching young toughs: Juvenile offenders find release in a creative writing class, Book Page, September 2003

1959 births
Living people
American cellists
20th-century American novelists
21st-century American novelists
American memoirists
American male novelists
American wushu practitioners
Writers from Greenwich, Connecticut
People from Ridgefield, Connecticut
Yale University alumni
20th-century American male writers
21st-century American male writers
Novelists from Connecticut
20th-century American non-fiction writers
21st-century American non-fiction writers
American male non-fiction writers